John Davison Hewie (13 December 1927 – 11 May 2015) was a South African-born Scottish international footballer, who spent most of his career with Charlton Athletic.

Playing career
Hewie was born in Pretoria, South Africa, to Scottish emigrant parents and lived there for the first 21 years of his life. He developed a keen interest in sport while at school, notably tennis and hockey. Football however was his primary pastime and he honed his skills first with his employer's works team then local sides Arcadia and Johannesburg.

In October 1949 the opportunity arose for Hewie to turn professional with English side Charlton Athletic, who had already imported several other South African-based players. He would spend the next 19 years in south-east London, making over 500 appearances for the Addicks and playing in almost every position, including four times as a goalkeeper when regular custodian Mick Rose was injured.

International
In 1956 he made his debut for the Scottish national side, playing in a 1–1 draw against England at Hampden Park. His first appearance in a Scotland shirt occurred three years earlier when he was selected for a Scotland B game in Edinburgh on the recommendation of Charlton's Scottish club doctor; it was the first occasion Hewie had set foot in Scotland. After playing well for a British-based South Africa representative side in an unofficial match in Glasgow in early 1956, he again came into consideration for the Scottish squad, and soon made the first of a total of 19 full appearances, predominantly at fullback, during which he scored twice. He was selected in the squad for the 1958 FIFA World Cup and missed a penalty in the 2–1 defeat by France.

Later life
Hewie briefly moved into a managerial role as his playing career ended, when he undertook the role of player-manager for non-league Kent side Bexley United. He returned to South Africa and first club Arcadia in 1968 and remained in the country of his birth until the early 1990s, at which point he returned to the United Kingdom. He lived in Spalding, Lincolnshire until his death in May 2015.

See also
 List of Scotland international footballers born outside Scotland

References

External links
 

1927 births
2015 deaths
Scottish footballers
South African soccer players
Scotland international footballers
Charlton Athletic F.C. players
1958 FIFA World Cup players
Scotland B international footballers
Soccer players from Pretoria
People from Spalding, Lincolnshire
Bexley United F.C. players
English Football League players
London XI players
Arcadia Shepherds F.C. players
Scottish football managers
Scottish expatriate football managers
South African people of Scottish descent
Association football fullbacks
South African emigrants to the United Kingdom
White South African people